Igo Kantor (c. 1930 – October 15, 2019) was an American film producer and post-production executive. Through his company, Synchrofilm, he did post-production work for Easy Rider, Five Easy Pieces and The King of Marvin Gardens, and he produced Kingdom of the Spiders and Mutant.

Biography
Kantor was born in Vienna and raised in Lisbon, met “Dillinger” director Max Nosseck on the ship to New York. Nosseck gave him an intro to his projectionist brother while Kantor was studying at UCLA. In the early 1960s, Kantor opened post-production house Synchrofilm, becoming the post-production supervisor on “The Monkees,” which led to Bert Schneider and Bob Rafelson hiring him to head post-production on “Easy Rider,” “Five Easy Pieces” and “The King of Marvin Gardens.” Kantor closed his post production facility in 1971, then moved on to Warner Bros., where he supervised post-production music on “The Exorcist.” He received Emmy nominations three years in a row for his work on the Bob Hope Christmas specials.

References

2019 deaths
Film people from Vienna
Austrian emigrants to the United States
University of California, Los Angeles alumni
American film producers
1930s births